Chung So-young (born 20 February 1967) is a former badminton player from South Korea. She was a gold medalist at the Barcelona Olympics in 1992 in the women's doubles together with Hwang Hye-young, and was inducted into the Badminton Hall of Fame in 2003.

Career 
Chung started to representing South Korea in the international tournament in November 1984.

She won a bronze medal at the 1987 World Championships in the women's doubles with Kim Yun-ja.

Partnered with Gil Young-ah, the duo ranked as world number 1 in 1993.

Personal life 
Chung graduated from Gunsan Girls' High School and later in Jeonbuk National University. She married Kim Bum-shik, also a former South Korean badminton player and now works as coach in Masan. Chung and Kim have three daughters, among them, their first child, Kim Hye-jeong, is a member of South Korea national team.

Achievements

Olympic Games 
Women's doubles

World Championships 
Women's doubles

World Cup 
Women's doubles

Mixed doubles

Asian Games 
Women's doubles

Mixed doubles

Asian Championships 
Women's doubles

Mixed doubles

Asian Cup 
Women's doubles

IBF World Grand Prix 
The World Badminton Grand Prix sanctioned by International Badminton Federation (IBF) from 1983 to 2006.

Women's doubles

Mixed doubles

IBF International 
Women's doubles

Mixed doubles

References

External links 
 
 
 
 

1967 births
Living people
People from Gimje
Sportspeople from North Jeolla Province
South Korean female badminton players
Badminton players at the 1988 Summer Olympics
Badminton players at the 1992 Summer Olympics
Olympic badminton players of South Korea
Olympic gold medalists for South Korea
Olympic medalists in badminton
Medalists at the 1992 Summer Olympics
Badminton players at the 1986 Asian Games
Badminton players at the 1990 Asian Games
Badminton players at the 1994 Asian Games
Asian Games gold medalists for South Korea
Asian Games silver medalists for South Korea
Asian Games bronze medalists for South Korea
Asian Games medalists in badminton
Medalists at the 1986 Asian Games
Medalists at the 1990 Asian Games
Medalists at the 1994 Asian Games
World No. 1 badminton players